Conchas Dam is a dam on the Canadian River in San Miguel County, New Mexico in the United States, about  northeast of Santa Rosa. The dam serves mainly for irrigation water supply and flood control and is operated by the U.S. Army Corps of Engineers.

First proposed in the early 1930s, the dam was initially rejected because of its remote site and Depression conditions in New Mexico. However, the dam was made a possibility in 1935 with the passage of the Emergency Relief Appropriation Act, which authorized several public works projects in New Mexico to provide relief to unemployment. Initial site work began in 1935 with construction on the actual dam starting in 1936. In 1939 construction was completed at a cost of $15.8 million.

The dam and reservoir are the primary feature of the Tucumcari Irrigation Project. Water released from the dam is diverted into  of canals which irrigate  of land in the Canadian River valley. The irrigation works were built by the U.S. Bureau of Reclamation from 1940–1942 and were turned over to the Arch Hurley Conservancy District in 1954.

References

External links
Conchas Lake – U.S. Army Corps of Engineers

Dams in New Mexico
Dams completed in 1939